William Sanderson (born January 10, 1944) is a retired American actor.  He played J. F. Sebastian in the feature film Blade Runner (1982), and had regular roles on several television series such as Larry on Newhart (1982–1990), E. B. Farnum on Deadwood (2004–2006, 2019), and 	Sheriff Bud Dearborne on True Blood (2008–2010, 2012).

Early life
Sanderson was born in Memphis, Tennessee on January 10, 1944 to an elementary school teacher mother and a landscape designer father. He is a 1962 graduate of Memphis Central High School. 

Sanderson volunteered for the U.S. Army when he was 18 years old. After his discharge, he attended  college using the G.I. Bill, first at Southern Methodist University for a year, then at the University of Memphis. He earned business (BBA, 1968) and law (J.D., 1971) degrees there (then known as Memphis State University), though he did not take the bar exam.

Career
Sanderson appeared as one of the mechanics and regulars of the diner in The Rocketeer, who defies Nazi agents looking for the top secret rocket pack. He also portrayed a character named Deuce in an episode of Babylon 5 and later reprised the role in Babylon 5: Thirdspace. Sanderson voiced Dr. Karl Rossum in Batman: The Animated Series. Sanderson starred in Fight for Your Life, which has a strict ban in the United Kingdom. He also played a supporting role as J. F. Sebastian in Ridley Scott's 1982 cyberpunk-noir film Blade Runner.

As a guest, he made appearances in television shows, and his credits include The Pretender, The X-Files, Knight Rider, Married... with Children, Babylon 5, ER, Coach, and Walker, Texas Ranger. He plays a key role in an audio dramatization of Ursula K. Le Guin's Vaster than Empires and More Slow in NPR's 2000X series. In 2001, Sanderson played the courageous bartender Dewey in the TNT film Crossfire Trail.

Sanderson played Larry in Newhart from 1982 to 1990, famous for the catchphrase, "Hi. I'm Larry. This is my brother Darryl. This is my other brother Darryl." Sanderson had a minor role as the abusive and cruel junkyard dealer Ray in Man's Best Friend.

He returned to television playing E. B. Farnum in the HBO television series Deadwood from 2004 to 2006, later reprising the role in its film continuation. In 2008, Sanderson joined the cast of True Blood, playing Sheriff Bud Dearborne. He played Oldham, the resident interrogation expert of the DHARMA Initiative in an episode of the fifth season of the ABC series Lost.

In May 2019, Sanderson released an autobiography about his career, Yes, I'm That Guy: The Rough-and-Tumble Life of a Character Actor. Following the release of his book, Sanderson and Nick "Saucey" Katsouros released a six-episode limited-run podcast, Sanderson Says, to discuss and expound on the autobiography.

Sanderson announced his retirement from acting on his Facebook page on May 13, 2020.

Personal life
William lives in Harrisburg, Pennsylvania  with his wife. He has one son and two grandchildren.

Filmography

Television

References

Further reading
 Voisin, Scott, Character Kings: Hollywood's Familiar Faces Discuss the Art & Business of Acting. BearManor Media, 2009. .

External links
 Official website
 
 

1944 births
Living people
American male comedians
American male film actors
American male television actors
University of Memphis alumni
Male actors from Memphis, Tennessee
Military personnel from Tennessee
20th-century American male actors
21st-century American male actors
20th-century American comedians
21st-century American comedians